Ängby SK is a sports club in Vällingby, Sweden. Established in 1956, the club won the Swedish national men's table tennis team championship in 1992 and 1995. Jan-Ove Waldner and Mikael Appelgren have played for the club.

During the 2014-2015 season, the women's team won the Swedish national championship.

References

External links
Official website 

1956 establishments in Sweden
Sport in Stockholm
Sports clubs established in 1956
Table tennis clubs in Sweden